Bruno Rafael Martins Amorim (born 12 May 1998) is a Portuguese footballer who plays for A.D. Sanjoanense as a forward.

Football career
On 17 January 2016, Amorim made his professional debut with Oliveirense in a 2015–16 Segunda Liga match against Farense. In 2017, it was confirmed by multiple sources that he was under trial at Manchester United with a view to a possible transfer to the English club.

Playing style
The Daily Mirror has remarked that Amorim has 'incredible pace and trickery'.

References

External links

Stats and profile at LPFP 

1998 births
Living people
Portuguese footballers
Association football forwards
Liga Portugal 2 players
Campeonato de Portugal (league) players
U.D. Oliveirense players
A.D. Sanjoanense players
Sportspeople from Aveiro District